Average yearly temperature is calculated by averaging the minimum and maximum daily temperatures in the country, averaged for the years 1961–1990, based on gridded climatologies from the Climatic Research Unit elaborated in 2011.

Data source: Mitchell, T.D., Carter, T.R., Jones, P.D., Hulme, M., New, M., 2003: A Comprehensive Set of High-Resolution Grids of Monthly Climate for Europe and the Globe: the Observed Record (1901-2000) and 16 Scenarios (2001-2100). J. Climate: submitted.

See also
 List of countries by average annual precipitation

Notes

References

Weather-related lists
Meteorology lists
Temperature, average
List of countries by average yearly temperature